Thomas Playford (26 November 1837 – 19 April 1915) was an Australian politician who served two terms as Premier of South Australia (1887–1889; 1890–1892). He subsequently entered federal politics, serving as a Senator for South Australia from 1901 to 1906 and as Minister for Defence from 1905 to 1907.

Early life
Born in Bethnal Green, London in 1837, Thomas Playford II moved to Adelaide in 1844 with his parents the Rev. Thomas Playford (c. 1795 – 18 September 1873) and his wife Mary Anne Playford, née Perry (c. 1804 – 27 April 1872), two brothers and a sister. He worked as a farmer prior to entering politics.

South Australian politics
Elected to the Parliament of South Australia at the 1868 election as the Member for Onkaparinga, he gained the sobriquet "Honest Tom" for his forthright and straightforward manner, although these same qualities would earn him the occasional disapproval of fellow politicians and the electorate, such as the remark in parliament stinkwort and Emil Wentzel were weeds that had come from Germany, a remark that contributed to his defeat at the 1871 election. Playford returned to Parliament at the 1875 election as member for East Torrens and held the position of Reforming Commissioner for Crown Lands and Immigration before losing his seat yet again at the 1887 election. A month later however, he won the seat of Newcastle. By mid-1887 he became Premier and Treasurer, positions he would hold for two years until a vote of no confidence passed. During his premiership, his most important achievement was considered to be the implementation of the first systematic tariff system for South Australia.

He regained East Torrens at the 1890 election and a few months later he formed his second government, again becoming Premier and Treasurer, and would again last for two years. He received kudos for significantly reducing the colony's debt, although he spent much of this second term in India. Charles Kingston brought together the various 'liberal' groups and was able to defeat the conservative John Downer government at the 1893 election with Labor support. The Kingston government would last for a then-record six years. Kingston had appointed Playford as Treasurer in his government, however in 1894 Playford moved to London to act as Agent-General for South Australia before returning to South Australia in 1898 to serve in Kingston's government from the 1899 election as member for Gumeracha, until he crossed the floor in later that year over a potential erosion of the power of the Legislative Council, bringing down the Kingston government in the process. He also found the time to involve himself in the planning of the Federation of the Australian Commonwealth and drafting the Australian Constitution. As part of this, he proposed the title "Commonwealth of Australia".

Federal politics

As a moderate Protectionist, but with the endorsement of the conservative Australasian National League (formerly National Defence League), Playford became a Senator at the inaugural 1901 federal election. Two years later in Alfred Deakin's government, Playford served for seven months as Leader of the Government in the Senate and Vice-President of the Executive Council. He became Minister for Defence in 1905 which he held for 18 months. He was defeated in the 1906 federal election, the first serving Minister to suffer this fate. His term as a Senator ended on 31 December 1906, and his ministerial commission was terminated on 24 January 1907. Playford made one further unsuccessful attempt to re-enter the Senate at the 1910 federal election.

Death
Playford died in Kent Town, Adelaide on 19 April 1915.

Family
Playford married Mary Jane Kinsman (born 20 May 1835, the daughter of Rev. William Kinsman) on 16 December 1860. The couple had eleven children: five sons, five daughters and one adoptive daughter.

His eldest daughter Annie (died 1956) married the Rev. John Henry Sexton on 30 June 1886.

On 1 January 1889 his second daughter Eliza (born 1866) married Harry J. Tuck (born 1863), elder brother of painter Marie Tuck and later headmaster at Unley High School.

Playford's grandson, Sir Thomas Playford, also served as Premier of South Australia.

Notes

See also
Hundred of Playford

References

Sources
 Jupp, J. (2004) The English in Australia, Cambridge University Press, Cambridge.
 

|-

|-

|-

|-

|-

|-

|-

|-

|-

|-

|-

|-

|-

Premiers of South Australia
Protectionist Party members of the Parliament of Australia
1837 births
1915 deaths
English emigrants to Australia
Members of the Cabinet of Australia
Members of the Australian Senate for South Australia
Members of the Australian Senate
Settlers of South Australia
Members of the South Australian House of Assembly
Leaders of the Opposition in South Australia
Treasurers of South Australia
Defence ministers of Australia
20th-century Australian politicians